The Stirling Knights are a Scottish basketball club based in the city of Stirling.

Club
The club was founded in April 2010 by among others Head Coach Pete Duncan, entering the Men's National League in September as one of four new clubs to the league in the following season.   The club received lottery funding - Awards4All late to help support capital costs of club equipment. The club is affiliated with Basketball Scotland, and fully supported by Active Stirling and sportscotland. The Knights have since developed a highly successful junior development program of over 500 members, as well as regularly producing players who represent Scotland. The success of the junior program is also a curse for the Senior team as often the best young players move onto the elite under-19 academies in England and abroad. In recent years, they have been one of the top clubs at U12, U14, U16 and U18 level with coaches Les McGlasson and Cory McCabe (National Team coach) enjoying success.

Club Structure

Junior Teams
Under 18 Men (U18 National League Division 1)
Under 16 Men (U16 National League Division 1)
Under 16 Women (U16 National League Division 1)
Under 10, 12 and 14 Boys and Girls Regional League squads

Senior Teams
Senior Men (National League Division 1)

Home arenas
The club are based at The Peak Sports Village in Stirling. It is a purpose built sports facility at Forthbank and was opened in 2008 following an investment of over £27 million, and has a capacity of 400. It has some of the best facilities for sports, including basketball, in the whole of Scotland.

Honours
Men's
  Division 2 Champions (2): 2015-16, 2019-20

Season-by-season records

References

External links

2009 establishments in Scotland
Basketball teams established in 2009
Basketball teams in Scotland
Sport in Stirling (council area)
Stirling (city)